Gornouralsky (masculine), Gornouralskaya (feminine), or Gornouralskoye (neuter) may refer to:
Gornouralsky Urban Okrug, the municipal formation in Sverdlovsk Oblast, Russia, which Prigorodny District of that oblast is incorporated as
Gornouralsky (urban locality), an urban locality (a work settlement) in Sverdlovsk Oblast, Russia